Sadabad (also Romanized as Sa‘dābād; also known as Saiyidābād and Seyyedābād) is a village in Shabeh Rural District, Jangal District, Roshtkhar County, Razavi Khorasan Province, Iran. At the 2006 census, its population was 362, in 99 families.

References 

Populated places in Roshtkhar County